Nupserha rufipennis is a species of beetle in the family Cerambycidae. It was described by Stephan von Breuning in 1949.

Subspecies
 Nupserha rufipennis rufipennis Breuning, 1949
 Nupserha rufipennis parterufoantennalis Breuning, 1978

References

rufipennis
Beetles described in 1949